Education in the Syrian Arab Republic is given the necessary attention and care by the Syrian state, as the Syrian Constitution guarantees the right to education to every citizen, which is compulsory and free at primary level. It is free but not compulsory at the secondary level and higher education is available for a symbolic fee. the primary level includes 2 stages, 1 & 2 which include grades 1 to 6
while the secondary school includes grades 7 to 10

Education is free and compulsory from ages 7 to 15. Arabic is the medium of instruction in the Syrian Arab Republic. English is taught from grade 1, and French or Russian is taught from grade 7 in the basic learning stage as the primary second language.

According to the 2007 census, 98 percent of schools in Syria were public (state run), 1.8 percent were private, and 0.2 percent were United Nations Relief and Works Agency schools for children who are refugees.

In 2007, there were 8 million students in the education system of Syria (4 million in basic education, 1.4 million in secondary and 2.3 million in tertiary). Given the current growth rate in the school age population, it is projected that by 2015, the education system in Syria will need to cater to an additional 1 million students in basic and secondary education.

The school system in Syria is divided into basic and secondary education levels:
 1st to 6th grade: Primary Education Level. From 1st to 4th grade, it’s called the First Ring (halaka oula) while 5th & 6th grade are called Second Ring (halaka thania)
 7th to 9th grade: Pre-Secondary Education Level (taelim 'edady )
 10th to 12th grade: Upper Secondary Education (taelim thanawi), which is the equivalent of High School.
Higher Education is the responsibility of the Ministry of Higher Education.

Early childhood care and education (ECCE)
The Government of Syria is also responsible for providing pre-primary or early childhood education. Up until the early 1990s, ECCE programs were provided by mostly non-governmental institutions, of which few belonged to the government sector, while others were either private or run by the Teacher's Syndicate, General Union of Workers (GUW) or the Women's Federation.

In 1990 only 5 percent of the children between the ages of 3 and 5 were enrolled in 793 kindergartens. Ten years later 7.8 percent of that age group was enrolled. Data from the Syrian Ministry of Education showed an increase in the number of kindergartens from 1096 to 1475 in 2004.

Basic education
The gross enrollment rate in primary education under basic education level in 2000 was 104.3 and it has been steadily rising, reaching to about 126.24 percent in 2007. Still, the enrollment of females is lower than males. The gender parity index, ratio of female enrollment to male enrollment, since 2006 was 0.955.

The enrollment level in all programs at the lower secondary level rose significantly from early 2000, with the current gross enrollment rate of 95.3 percent.

At the secondary lower level final exams of the 9th grade are carried out nationally at the same time. The result of these exams determines if the student goes to the "general" secondary schools or the technical secondary schools. Technical secondary schools include industrial and agricultural schools for male and female students, crafts school for female students, and commercial and computer science schools for both. It is mandatory for all Syrians to attend this basic level of education.

Secondary education

The upper secondary education is for three years from grade 10 to grade 12. At the beginning of the 11th grade, those who go to "general" secondary school have to choose to continue their study in either the "literary branch" or the "scientific branch".
The final exams of the 12th grade, commonly known as the Baccalauréat, are also carried out nationally and at the same time. The result of these exams determines which university, college and specialization the student attends. To do that, the student has to apply through a complicated system called "mufadalah".

There are wide regional disparities in post-basic education. There are lower secondary and university enrollments in rural than urban areas. Even the higher income households in rural areas do not have access to post-secondary education opportunities.

The secondary gross enrollment rate in 2007 stood at 72 percent, higher than the preceding years and one percentage point higher than the 2007 MENA regional gross enrollment rate at the secondary level.

Technical and vocational education and training (TVET)
At the secondary level, the education system also includes three years of general or vocational education. Syria has a relatively large proportion of secondary school students in vocational schools; about 36 percent of total secondary school students in 2004 are in vocational schools. According to UIS the total enrollment in technical and vocational education (both private and public) in 2007 decreased to 103 from 113,994 students in 2006. Out of the total number, 41898 were female students enrolled in TVET.

In 1990s, the government aimed to increase TVET enrollment and at one time decided to allocate 70 percent of the lower secondary graduates to vocational schools, which meant doubling the share of TVET in total enrollment from 20 percent in 1990 to 40 percent in 2000. However, this later proved unsustainable. Then in 2000 a new policy stipulated 50:50 distributions of secondary students between general and vocational secondary education, and this was later decreased to 40 percent. Students enrolled in four main specializations:commercial,industrial, agricultural and handicrafts. The TVET system in Syria is very rigid with no options of reentering the formal school system.

University education

The earliest colleges founded in Syria were the School of Medicine (established 1903) and the Institute of Law (established 1913). The university education was founded in 1919 on a free of charge basis.

The Ministry of Higher Education was established in 1966 to supervise the scientific and educational institutions, such as universities, academic councils, the Arabic Language Academy and educational hospitals. Most post-secondary education is state-provided, but legislation passed in 2001 allows the establishment of some private universities and colleges. Resources for education have risen in absolute terms over the past decade, but it is difficult to match the rate of population growth. Colleges charge modest fees ($10–20 a year) if the student achieves the sufficient marks in their Baccalaureate exams. If not, the student may opt to pay higher fees ($1500–3000) to enroll. There are some private schools and colleges but their fees are much higher.

Domestic policies emphasize engineering and medicine in Syria’s universities, with less emphasis on the arts, law, and business. Most universities in Syria follow the French model of the high education, the university stages and the academic degrees are:

First stage: the License awarded after four to six years depending on the field.

Second stage: the DEA or DESS one to two years postgraduate degree equivalent to the master's degree in the American-English systems.

Third stage: the doctorate three to five years after the DEA or an equivalent degree.

20 private universities have been given licenses, 14 of which have actually opened and 6 to be opened soon.
Private universities will have an independent academic and management structure representing the owner and will be headed by the president of the university. There will also be a university board consisting of either: chancellor, faculty or division.

Private Universities

 Syrian Private University
 Al Rasheed International Private University for Science & Technology - Damascus
 International University for Sciences and Technology (IUST) - Damascus
 University of Kalamoon - Deir Atiyah
 The Arab European University - Sahnaya
 Al-Jazeera University - Deir ez Zor
 Al-Manara University - Latakia
 Al-Andalus University - Qadmous
 Al-Sham Private University - Damascus
 Arab International University (AIU) - Damascus
 International University for Science and Technology - Damascus
 Wadi International University
 Arab Academy for E-Business - Damascus

Public Universities

 Damascus University in Damascus
 Aleppo University in Aleppo
 Al-Baath University in Homs
 Hama University in Hama
 Al-Furat University in Deir ez Zor
 Tishreen University in Lattakia
 University of Tartus in Tartus
 Syrian Virtual University in Damascus
Rojava University in Qamishli
The Centre for Measurement and Evaluation in Higher Education (CME), which was established in 2012, assesses the performance of students, programs, and educational institutions. The centre was founded to set clear criteria for cross-border certificates based on the methodology, techniques and institutional standard measurement tools. its aim is to measure knowledge, skills and attitudes in a scientific way, to ensure the quality of higher education outputs to meet developmental needs.

Higher technical institutes
 Higher Institute of Marine Research
 Higher Institute of Water Resource Management
 Higher Institute of Business Administration
Higher Institute for Applied Sciences and Technology

Virtual university
In September 2002, the first virtual university was founded. through which students can obtain degrees from international institutions.
The university is called Syrian Virtual University.

Baathism education

The Arab Socialist Ba'ath Party heavily influences the educational system in Syria, in which primary school students called “Al-Ba’ath Vanguards”, elementary school students led by "Revolutionary Youth Union", and college students headed by “National Union of Students”, are injected with Baathism ideology, Pan-Arabism and socialist beliefs.

According to the Constitution of Syria of 1973, Chapter 3: Educational and Cultural Principles, Article 21, it is written:

The article was later scrapped in the new Constitution of 2012. Nevertheless, the students are still being taught to Baathism through a subject known as "Political Arab Sociology".

Computer literacy
This measure and others, such as making computer literacy mandatory at the high-school level and English- and French-language instruction compulsory in the elementary schools, have the goal of equipping students with computer and language skills in order to modernize the economy through the education system.

Challenges
Syria has shown great progress in providing access to basic education and to some extent, post basic education to the growing population. Still Syria has a long way to go to bring about a comprehensive change in the education system.

Access to pre-primary level education is low in Syria when compared to other lower-middle income countries. The enrollment at the pre-primary level is 10 percent in Syria whereas it is 15.7 percent in the MENA region in 2007. The Government of Syria has to make substantial investments in infrastructure to improve access to preprimary education. The government needs to prioritize expansion of schools especially in underserved areas with vulnerable populations. According to research findings, children of disadvantaged backgrounds are the ones that benefit the most from early childhood programs by developing basic skills necessary for employment thereby moving them out of abject poverty. Currently, most of the Early Childhood Care and Education services in Syria are delivered through private kindergartens and non-governmental organizations (NGOs) based in urban areas.

Despite increasing quantity of human capital through increasing access to education at all levels, the improvement of quality of the education and training system and consequently the quality of human capital is another challenge that Government of Syria needs to address. Weak growth in labor productivity over the past two decades has been associated with low quality and relevance of education in Syria. The results of International test scores TIMSS show that 44 percent of students who appeared in this international exam performed below the lowest international benchmark. Therefore, there is a greater need to improve the quality of overall education system. This also involves the need to incorporate the use of communication and technology to better prepare students to the demands of the globalised world. Currently, Syria’s computer and internet usage is very low compared to a number of neighboring countries and is much lower than the average for lower middle income countries.

Syria also faces high repetition and dropout rates. The repetition rate at primary level has been very high, almost 12 percent in 2006 and has been steadily rising since 2003. At the secondary level, repetition rate has reached almost 20 percent. According to the latest data in 2004/05 the average repetition rate was 6 percent for grade 1-6, 13.3 percent for grades 7-9, and 7.3 percent for grades 10-12.Drop-out rates stood at 2.2 percent for grades 1-6, 8 percent for grades 7-9, and 7.3 percent for grades 10-12. Along with high repetition and dropout rates, a fairly low student–teacher ratio also signals internal inefficiency in the education system. The ratio in Syria is low due to the relatively high recruitment of teachers in comparison to the growth of students. The number of teachers grew at an annual rate of 7 percent between 2000 and 2006, which is almost twice the growth rate for students, which resulted in STR of 19:1 in basic education and 9:1 in secondary education. To increase the internal efficiency, the government should focus on hiring trained and competent teachers, reform the curriculum and develop testing, evaluation and measurement.

Then the increasing unemployment rate, especially among youth, implies poor education quality along with lack of infrastructure to absorb the rising population. The youth unemployment rate in Syria stood at 19 percent in 2003. The current system is unable to provide with the skills and competencies demanded in the labor market. Therefore, there is a need to connect education institutions, especially higher education and vocational institutes, to the labor market and to align the curricula with skills that could increase employability of the graduates. Apart from improving the curriculum the government needs to make major infrastructure adjustments to absorb the rising population of the country into the already burdened education system. In 2007, the education system in Syria catered for about 8 million students. Given the current growth rate of 4.3 percent per annum of school age population, it is projected that by 2015, the education system in Syria will need to cater for an additional 1 million students in basic and secondary education.

Impact of the Syrian Civil War 
The Syrian Civil War is a major barrier to quality education for all in Syria, reversing development gains in the country. In addition to causing widespread destruction of learning spaces, the crisis has forced more than 2.1 million children and youth out of school in Syria; an additional 3.3 million in Syria need educational assistance, and 1.4 million Syrian children and youth are refugees in the five main host countries (Egypt, Iraq, Jordan, Lebanon, and Turkey). In 2011, Syria had achieved universal primary enrolment and was near universal enrolment in lower secondary education. More concretely, 91% of primary school-aged children were in school in 2011, but by 2015 the rate had plummeted to 37%.

See also 

 Newcomer education
 Education in emergencies and conflict areas

Sources

References

External links 
 Joshua Landis,"Islamic Education in Syria"